Sunil Seth (born 22 August 1990 in London), also known as Sunny Seth, is an English-born Guyanese squash player who represents Guyana. He achieved a career-high world ranking of 122 in January 2015. He has represented Guyana at the 2014 Commonwealth Games, the 2015 Pan American Games and the 2018 Commonwealth Games.

References

1990 births
Living people
Guyanese male squash players
Squash players at the 2014 Commonwealth Games
Squash players at the 2018 Commonwealth Games
Commonwealth Games competitors for Guyana
Squash players at the 2015 Pan American Games
Pan American Games competitors for Guyana
Sportspeople from London